Events in the year 1641 in Portugal.

Incumbents
King: John IV

Events
March 27 - beginning of the 11 month Siege of São Filipe near Angra do Heroismo in the Azores
June 12 - Treaty of The Hague (1641) is signed in The Hague representatives of the States-General of the Netherlands and by the ambassador of the Kingdom of Portugal
November 18 - John IV ratifies the treaty of The Hague

Births

Deaths

 
1640s in Portugal
Portugal